In enzymology, a 10-hydroxytaxane O-acetyltransferase is an enzyme that catalyzes the chemical reaction

acetyl-CoA + 10-desacetyltaxuyunnanin C  CoA + taxuyunnanin C

Thus, the two substrates of this enzyme are acetyl-CoA and 10-desacetyltaxuyunnanin C, whereas its two products are CoA and taxuyunnanin C.

This enzyme belongs to the family of transferases, specifically those acyltransferases transferring groups other than aminoacyl groups.  The systematic name of this enzyme class is acetyl-CoA:taxan-10beta-ol O-acetyltransferase. This enzyme is also called acetyl coenzyme A: 10-hydroxytaxane O-acetyltransferase.

References

 

EC 2.3.1
Enzymes of unknown structure